This is a list of museums in Aruba.

Museums 
 A. van den Doel Bible Museum
 Aloe Museum
 Community Museum
 Historical Museum of Aruba
 Industry Museum of Aruba
 Model Trains Museum
 Museum of Antiquities Aruba
 National Archaeological Museum Aruba
 De Olde Molen
 Nicolaas Store
 Sports Museum of Aruba

Defunct museums 
 Numismatic Museum of Aruba

See also 
 List of museums by country

References 

Aruba
 
Aruba
Museums
Aruba

Museums